WLII-DT (channel 11), branded on-air as TeleOnce, is a television station licensed to Caguas, Puerto Rico, serving the U.S. territory as an affiliate of Univision and UniMás. Owned by Liberman Media Group, the station maintains studio facilities on Calle Carazo in Guaynabo, with additional studios at The Mall of San Juan. Its transmitter is located near the Bosque Estatal de Carite mountain reserve.

TeleOnce operates two satellite stations: WSUR-DT (channel 9) in Ponce and WOLE-DT (channel 12) in Aguadilla.

History

Telecadena Perez-Perry (1960–1981) 
In 1960, Rafael Perez Perry received authorization from the government to start WKBM-TV on May 23, broadcasting on channel 11, as part of his new Telecadena Perez-Perry chain of television stations. Some of the shows that WKBM-TV aired throughout those years included Una Hora Contigo and Tira y Tapate with Myrta Silva, Yo Soy el Gallo with José Miguel Class, El Show de Carmita with Carmita Jiménez, El Show de Lissette, El Show de Iris Chacón, El Hit del Momento and El Super Show Goya with Enrique Maluenda, Lillian Hurst and Luz Odilia Font, Una Chica llamada: Ivonne Coll, Cambia Cambia con Alfred D. Herger, Almorzando and Del Brazo with Ruth Fernández, and Mediodia Circular with Vilma Carbia. At the time, Perez Perry owned one of the most successful radio stations on the island, WKVM (810 AM). Perez Perry died of a heart attack of unknown cause while he was working on the transmitter in the late 1970s; his death eventually resulted in WKBM-TV declaring bankruptcy in 1981. The station went silent that year. Its former competition benefited from WKBM's demise—not only from a reduction in competition itself, but also from the availability of many of the stations' former hosts and talent.

TeleOnce (First Era, 1986–2002) 
In 1985, production company Lorimar-Telepictures (with the Telepictures division now part of Warner Bros. Television) acquired the station from bankruptcy court. The callsign became WLII-TV on December 12, and was branded as "TeleOnce" on April 27, 1986, with a new slogan: "TeleOnce… Vívelo!" ("TeleOnce…Live it!"). Warner Communications (now part of Warner Bros. Discovery) would gain indirect ownership of the stations after it bought Lorimar-Telepictures in 1988. The station became a success around this time by airing popular American programs translated in Spanish, especially The Simpsons. However, its lack of a repeater or rebroadcaster on the western portion of the island continued to put it behind the competition, WKAQ-TV (channel 2) and WAPA-TV (channel 4). That all changed when WNJX-TV (channel 22) in Mayagüez signed an affiliation agreement with the station in the late 1980s. WLII was subsequently sold to Malrite Communications Group in 1991 after it sold WSTE-TV (channel 7); Malrite merged with Raycom Media in 1998.

On January 1, 1995, at midnight, TeleOnce entered into its first marketing agreement with a television station in western Puerto Rico, WORA-TV (channel 5), which at that time had ended an affiliation agreement with WKAQ-TV. In turn, WKAQ-TV switched its affiliation agreement to WOLE-TV (channel 12), which was WAPA-TV's repeater station at the time; this left WAPA-TV out of the western Puerto Rico television market for the first time in 30 years.

Some of the shows that aired on WLII during this time included En Un Día, R con R, El Show de Awilda, Dime la Verdad, Ellas al Mediodía, La Noche es Nuestra, Fiesta, A Fuego, Pulso Preciso, Lio, El Super Show, Que Suerte que es Domingo, Anda Pa'l Cará, Entrando por la Cocina, NBA Jam, Atácate (a Spanish-language version of NBA Inside Stuff) and El Kiosko Budweiser.

In the late 1980s, actresses Ángela Meyer and Camille Carrión founded Empresas Meca, a production company, which produced some of the last telenovelas shot in Puerto Rico: La Isla, Ave de Paso (starring Yolandita Monge), Yara Prohibida and La Otra.

Univision Puerto Rico (2002–2021) 

In 2002, Univision entered into a local marketing agreement with Raycom Media to operate WLII and WSUR-TV. At the time, WLII had a longtime local marketing agreement with another Puerto Rican station, WSTE (channel 7), which Univision honored. Both WLII and WSUR-TV were sold to Univision Communications in 2005; Univision bought WSTE at the end of 2007. Although Univision operates a second network, UniMás, in the mainland United States, WSTE remains an independent station. In 2005, WLII relocated from its studios in the Puerta de Tierra area of San Juan to a new facility in Guaynabo.

On October 17, 2014, WLII-DT laid off 109 staffers and canceled most of its local programming, becoming a repeater of Univision network programming with minimal local content. With the move, the station's daily talk show, Ruben & Co., became the only local program still produced by WLII. In addition, WLII shared a general manager with Univision's Puerto Rico radio stations.

On February 25, 2020, investment firms ForgeLight (launched by founder & CEO & ex-Viacom CFO Wade Davis) and Searchlight Capital agreed to acquire the 64% controlling stake of Univision Communications which owned WLII-DT, while minority owner Televisa continued to hold its 36% stake with the company. However, both Searchlight and ForgeLight had a stake in Hemisphere Media Group, which owns WAPA-TV in San Juan. Univision was required to divest WLII and its satellite stations in order to comply with ownership limits.

Liberman purchase and the return of TeleOnce (2021–present) 
On August 27, 2020, Univision announced that WLII and its satellite stations would be acquired by Liberman Media Group, a company owned by Estrella Media founder Lenard Liberman, for $1 million each. The sale was completed on December 10, 2020. Univision retained WSTE-DT, WKAQ-AM and WKAQ-FM. It was also reported that WLII would bring back the TeleOnce branding, which the station used for 15 years from 1986 to 2002. On January 19, 2021, Liberman Media Group named Winter Horton as the new General Manager for the station.

WLII-DT (and its repeaters) aired as Univision Puerto Rico until February 18, 2021, when the on screen branding switched to TeleOnce at 8 p.m. The station held a press conference unveiling the new station logo and a new slate of programming which includes the return of local newscasts after more than six years of the dissolution of the original news department, with longtime WAPA-TV news director José Enrique Cruz named as an adviser for the newly established news department and the debut of new shows like Ahora Es que Es and a new season of La Comay which premiered on March 1 at 5:55 p.m., bringing high ratings for the revamped network.

On March 2, 2021, WLII's second digital subchannel launched as a UniMás affiliate, branded as UniMás Puerto Rico.

On July 2, 2021, Liberman Media Group and TeleOnce entered a distribution agreement with SBS operated stations WACX-DT11 in Orlando, Florida  and WGCT-LD in Tampa, Florida to show TeleOnce programming on their stations. Local programs La Comay, Jugando Pelota Dura and Ahora Es que Es would begin airing on the Mega TV stations either live or on tape delay the same day they are originally aired in Puerto Rico. This agreement marks the first time local Puerto Rican programming is exported to the mainland United States since the launch of WAPA America in 2004.

On December 8, 2021, WLII-DT unveiled their new studio facility at The Mall of San Juan. The facility, which will occupy one of the empty anchor spaces at the shopping center, was unveiled during the station's upfront presentation which was held at the site. The station's new game show La Boveda de Mr. Cash was the first to broadcast live from the new studios when it premiered on March 1, 2022.

WSUR-TV history (1958–present) 
WSUR-TV was founded on February 20, 1958, by American Colonial Broadcasting. In 1963, the station was located on Avenida Tito Castro (Puerto Rico Highway 14) in the La Rambla sector of Barrio Machuelo Abajo; its transmitter tower was located within the municipality of Guayanilla, Puerto Rico, and it was an affiliate of WAPA-TV, but carried two local programs from Ponce. Currently, WSUR originates no local programming of its own. The station transmitted its analog signal over VHF channel 9. Its tower is now located at Cerro Jayuya in the border between the municipality of Ponce with Jayuya.

Programming

Las Noticias TeleOnce (1986-2002, 2021–present) Las Noticias Univisión  (2002–2014) 

News programming on WLII began in May 1986, with Ramón Enrique Torres and Jennifer Wolff as anchors of the 5:00 p.m. newscast. In 1990, a noon newscast premiered with Torres and Margarita Aponte as its anchors, followed by the 10:30 p.m. newscast with Torres. On March 11, 1991, a weekday morning news program, Tu Mañana, made its debut; the program was anchored by Carlos Ochoteco and Cyd Marie Fleming and featured segments such as panels of experts on different topics.

Over the years, many people worked on Tu Mañana and Las Noticias. Reporters such as Carmen Dominicci, Elwood Cruz, Susan Soltero, Bruni Torres, Nuria Sebazco, Rommy Segarra, Felipe Gómez (now at WAPA-TV), Ada Monzón (now at WAPA-TV), Liza Lugo and many others have been featured.

In 1996, a monthly investigative/tabloid newsmagazine began airing called Las Noticias Xtra, which offered reports considered to be shocking by many. Taboo themes in Puerto Rican society such as homosexuality were featured. Las Noticias Xtra eventually was reduced to a weekly segment seen during the 6:00 and 11:00 p.m. newscasts.

During WLII's TeleOnce years, the station's slogan was "TeleOnce: 24 horas el canal de Las Noticias" ("TeleOnce, the 24-hour news channel"), paralleling the 24 Hour News Source trend in the United States at this time. After the Univision integration in 2002, Las Noticias became Las Noticias Univision and acquired the branding of all other Univision O&O stations news broadcasts. WLII began broadcasting its local newscasts in high definition on September 26, 2010. Due to budget cuts that were imposed by Univision in Miami, WLII reduced its news department by between 20 and 50 employees, and Las Noticias a las 6 was reduced from one hour to 30 minutes. The station discontinued its weekend newscasts on January 5, 2014; following this reducing its news operation from 35½ to 32½ hours each week and caused the firing of 19 employees.

On October 17, 2014, Univision announced that Jaime Bauzá was ascending his position to senior vice-president and general manager of all of the network's operations in Puerto Rico. The first change he made was the firing of 109 employees. This caused the closing of the entire news department, including reporters, anchors, cameramen, etc. On that day, the morning show Tu Mañana was shown normally, but after that, the midday show Tu Mediodia wasn't shown. Instead, a Mexican drama was shown. During that time, reporter Daisy Sánchez published on her Twitter account the announcing of the news department's closing.

The roundtable talk show Rubén & Co. replaced the 5:00 p.m. spot left by Las Noticias. The program was originally a half hour program shown weeknights at 10:30 p.m. Since the closing of the news department, the show filled the 5 p.m. spot and was extended from half an hour of duration to an hour until its cancellation on January 20, 2016.

On February 18, 2021, TeleOnce hired José Enrique "Kike" Cruz, who was news director at WAPA-TV for 32 years and who worked at the station  from 1976 until his retirement in 2018 as an adviser for the revamped news department after more than six years without newscasts. On April 14, 2021, TeleOnce hired Jenny Suarez, a former news producer at WAPA-TV, as its vice-president of the revamped news department.

On June 7, 2021, WLII-DT confirmed their intentions to relaunch their newscasts with the new telecast set to premiere in late July/early August 2021 in the 5 p.m. slot. Celimar Adames Casalduc (who anchored WAPA-TV's NotiCentro for 18 years) would join TeleOnce as the lead anchor for the newscast and Deborah Martorell (who served as WAPA-TV's Chief Meteorologist for 27 years) would also be joining as TeleOnce's Chief Meteorologist. Nuria Sebazco (who previously hosted TeleOnce's morning newscast Tu Mañana) was also announced to be returning to the network (migrating from WKAQ-TV) and Tatiana Ortiz (also from WKAQ) was also announced as on air talent. On June 8, 2021, WLII-DT announced that Ricardo Currás (formerly of WKAQ-TV and who anchored morning newscasts from Univision O&O WXTV-DT), would join Adames as co-anchor.

On June 23, 2021, WLII-DT announced that their relaunched newscast would be called Las Noticias TeleOnce thus reviving the original brand that ran for almost 30 years. Las Noticias TeleOnce premiered on July 12, 2021, with three editions: Las Noticias: Ahora (The News: Now) at 3:55 p.m., Las Noticias: Prime (The News: Prime) at 4:55 p.m. and Las Noticias: Última Edición (The News: Final Edition) at 10:00 p.m. All three editions will be anchored by Adames and Currás and will feature Martorell on the weather and Luis Joel Aymat (who anchored the former Edicion Puerto Rico newscast) in sports.

On October 4, 2021, Las Noticias added a political analysis team composed of former Puerto Rican Governor Anibal Acevedo Vila, former gubernatorial candidate Alexandra Lúgaro, journalist and Jugando Pelota Dura contributor Leo Aldridge and Lawyer Ramón Rosario Cortés. The segment entitled "El Comentario de la Tarde" features one of the aforementioned commentators breaking down a news item alongside anchors Currás and Adames.

On October 11, 2021, The nightly newscast Las Noticias: Última Edición moved from 10 p.m. to 11 p.m. due to premiere of WLII's new late-night talk show Acuéstate con Francis.

On November 18, 2021, WLII-DT announced that Las Noticias would add another daily newscast, this one during the midday time slot. The newscast titled Las Noticias Al Mediodía (The News at Noon) debuted December 6, 2021, at 12pm and features Celimar Adames, Nuria Sebazco and Deborah Martorell, which WLII is touting as the first all-female team in local news on the island. This edition follows a different format from the other newscast features segments on lifestyle, travel and finances.

On December 3, 2021, Celimar Adames announced on her Instagram account she will no longer anchor the 11 p.m. broadcast Última Edición to focus on anchoring the midday edition and the afternoon broadcast. On the same post, she announced that field reporter Shirlyan Odette would be taking over anchoring duties for the 11 p.m. broadcast alongside Ricardo Currás.

During the station's upfront presentation, VP of News Jenny Suarez and consultant José Enrique "Kike" Cruz announced that WLII will additionally be reviving their morning news show Tu Mañana. The show was slated to return in early 2022 over 8 years after the abrupt cancellation of the show while it was on the air in October 2014, this however did not happen and during the station's 2023 Upfront presentation in December 2022 it was announced that Tu Mañanas return is now schedule to take place in late 2023.

On December 14, 2021, WLII-DT launched a new investigative unit for the news department headed by journalist and lawyer Mardelis Jusino, who has worked at the investigative division of Jugando Pelota Dura, also worked for WAPA-TV and WMTJ. The investigative unit team consists of Melissa Correa, who worked for 18 years at El Vocero, Tatiana Ortiz and Arnaldo Rojas, who worked as an anchor/reporter for WAPA-TV from 2002 to 2008, The Univision-owned stations in Sacramento (KUVS-DT) and Houston (KXLN-DT) and served as a Houston-based correspondent for VOA News.

On January 11, 2022, WLII-DT announced that former representative Gary Rodriguez, who worked for WAPA-TV's Lo Sé Todo would be joining Las Noticias as a political commentator and other projects. His on-air debut was on January 15, 2022. The new section titled El Fuetazo de Gary officially began on January 24, 2021, and airs during the midday and evening newscasts.

On January 23, 2022, WLII-DT announced that Liam Rodríguez Muñoz, who was recently worked for ABC News Extra, joins the news department as a videojournalist and reporter. Rodríguez Muñoz previously worked for the station, as a panelist for Los Seis de la Tarde and as a reporter and content producer for Jugando Pelota Dura.

On March 22, 2022, Andrea Rivera, who worked for WAPA-TV as a host for Viva la Tarde, joins WLII-DT's news department as an entertainment reporter, and premiered its segment called Primera Fila on April 4, 2022. Also, she co-hosts La Boveda de Teleonce, which served as a lead-in for Las Noticias.

Jugando Pelota Dura (2017–present)

In November 2017, it was announced that the political analysis show Jugando Pelota Dura would move to Univision Puerto Rico after initially premiering on NCN Television and Sistema TV. The show, hosted by radio personality and former PPD legislator Ferdinand Perez with a panel of journalists and political analysts discussing current events, began airing soon after at the 6 p.m. spot before bouncing around several time slots on the station. Currently the program airs at 7 p.m. after La Comay and features Leo Aldridge, who was a reporter for Primera Hora from 2002 to 2005, Alex Delgado from NotiUno, Cyd Marie Fleming and Margarita Aponte as contributors, both of whom were original reporters for Las Noticias prior to it shutting down in 2014.

On August 28, 2022, the show premiered its new special Sunday edition called Jugando Pelota Dura: Puerto Rico Habla (Puerto Rico Speaks). The show works as a town hall meeting where a live audience is welcomed and encouraged to ask questions on social problems and a panel of experts and local politicians is present to respond to these issues and offer solutions. The specials will air once a month on Sundays in the show's usual time slot of 7 p.m. and will take place from the channel's studios at The Mall of San Juan.

Acuéstate con Francis (2021–2022)

On June 11, 2021, WLII announced the surprise signing of Puerto Rican Comedian Francis Rosas, who had worked as part of comedy projects on WAPA-TV for over 20-years. The deal with Rosas allowed the comedian to launch his own comedy show with him serving as executive producer and his production company working alongside WLII's owner, Liberman Media Group, in the production of other future projects.

At the time of Rosas' signing with WLII the comedian was still under contract with WAPA-TV's Sanco Productions, owned by actor and comedian Sunshine Logroño. On July 2, 2021, Logroño and his wife Gilda Santini sued Francis Rosas and his production company for breach of contract (Rosas had signed a 2-year extension to his contract with WAPA-TV in January 2021), additionally the lawsuit asked Rosas to pay $100,000 in damages and it included a request for the court to prohibit Rosas from appearing on any television network until the end of his deal in October 2022. On July 15, 2021, The First Instance Court of San Juan denied the injunction by Logroño to prohibit Rosas from appearing on any other television network until 2022 citing that "The court recognized an artists' liberty of working where they pleased"

On September 27, 2021, it was announced that the title of Rosas' upcoming show would be Acuéstate con Francis (Go to Bed with Francis), the show's premiere date was scheduled for October 11, 2021, at 10 p.m. Rosas described the show as a family show that would follow a late-night talk show format that would feature sketches, interviews and games with a variety of guests and a live studio audience. The show officially premiered on October 11, 2021, featuring guests Félix Trinidad, Celimar Adames Casalduc and musical guest Nio Garcia who performed his single "Tus Poses". The premiere also featured special appearances by Danilo Beauchamp and Alejandro Gil who worked alongside Rosas on WAPA-TV, the duo teased joining rosas on WLII in the future. 

On July 13, 2022, WLII-DT operator Liberman Media Group cancelled the show with the final episode announced to air on July 15. Rosas is expected to continue to work with the station and will develop a new show through his production company (Rosas and Pitbull, Co.). The final episode aired on Friday July 15, 2022, and featured Rosas' comedy partners Danilo Beuchamp and Alejandro Gil, Urban Artist Alejo and Influencer Andrea Ojeda Cruz "La Peki" as guests and closed with the show's house band playing the chorus to Chumbawamba's "Tubthumping".

La Boveda de Mr. Cash (2021–2022)/La Boveda de TeleOnce (2022–present)

In August 2021, WLII-DT announced that they had signed on local game show host Mr. Cash (who previously had hosted shows for WAPA-TV and WTCV) to a deal with the station to develop a new daytime game show. During the station's upfront presentation it was announced the show would be called La Boveda de Mr. Cash and would broadcast live from the station's new studios at The Mall of San Juan Although during their upfront the station announced the show would premiere on January 31, that date would later be pushed back to March 1. The show premiered on March 1, 2022, live from The Mall of San Juan with a full studio audience at the 2:55 p.m. time-slot and serves as a lead-in for Las Noticias. The addition of the show signifies that WLII-DT is now running five hours of local programming in a row and  hours of local programming on weekdays, something the station had not done since before the Univision acquisition in 2002.

The show's name translate to Mr. Cash's Vault alluding to the format of the show, where participants play quick games and the winner of the game gets the opportunity to enter a vault located in the studio full of prizes that range from flat screen televisions to $10,000 in cash.

On August 5, 2022, WLII announced that La Boveda would be moving to prime time. Starting August 22, 2022, the show would begin airing at the 8 p.m. time slot following Jugando Pelota Dura. It is currently unknown if the show will continue airing at 2:55 p.m. though the stations advertisement for the prime time edition branded the show as just La Boveda (as opposed to the La Boveda de Mr. Cash). On August 12, 2022, it was announced that Josué Carrión would not continue as host when then show moves to its new time slot on August 22. It was reported that Carrión's schedule did not allow him to work the 8 p.m. time slot and based on that it was decided he would leave the show. Moving forward the show will just be referred to as La Boveda (The Vault); co-hosts Andrea Rivera, Luis Fontánez "Finito" and Awilda Herrera are expected to continue hosting the show after Carrión leaves.

On August 22, 2022, the show officially moved to its new time slot of 8:00 p.m. and was officially rebranded as La Boveda de TeleOnce (TeleOnce's Vault). During the premiere, Andrés Waldemar Volmar was introduced as one of the new co-hosts of the show; a new logo and set was also introduced. The show also introduced its new feature game "TeleBingo" which allows the audience at home to participate by using Bingo cards distributed through local newspaper El Vocero and at local Burger King restaurants; participants are encouraged to keep track of the Bingo game taking place during the live show and call as soon as they hit Bingo with the first call to come through winning up to $1,000 cash. During the station's 2023 Upfront presentation it was announced that La Boveda de TeleOnce would  air new episodes live on Saturdays, making Sunday the only day when the show is not on the air. The Saturday version is slated to run for two hours as opposed to the weekly version which runs for just 60 minutes.

PR En Vivo (2022–present)

Following the cancellation of Acuestate con Francis in July it was clarified that although the show was ending, comedian Francis Rosas was still under contract with Liberman Media Group and that he was already working on his next project for the station. On September 16, 2022, it was announced on La Comay that the station planned to premiere a new midday show featuring Rosas alongside radio personality Deddie Romero as co-host, said show would air weekdays at 12:30 p.m. and have a half hour duration. This information was later confirmed on September 27 by the station when the official promotional material announcing the show was released. The name of the show was announced as PR En Vivo (PR Live) and it premiered on October 10, 2022, at 12:30pm. The show features Rosas and Romero discussing a variety of lifestyle issues, news, and conducting interviews with guests. A biweekly (Mondays and Wednesdays) segment featuring PNP Representative Jorge "Georgie" Navarro will also give viewers the opportunity to call in and report local issues to be resolved by the politician.

El Poder del Pueblo (2022–present)

In January 2022, Gary Rodriguez signed on to join WLII (making the move from WAPA-TV), Rodriguez's agreement signed him to join the station's newscast Las Noticias but eventually to also develop his own show. On October 21, 2022, WLII-DT announced that a new project would be premiering on the station. The project, titled El Poder Del Pueblo (The People's Power) looks to focus on community issues affecting the people of Puerto Rico and looking for ways to bring a light to them and solving them. Rodriguez will be hosting the show and he'll be joined by Jessica Serrano and Shalimar Rivera (who previously worked for the station on the cancelled Ahora es que es). Additionally, the show will feature Ricardo Eladio Martínez (who previously worked on La Comay as a reporter), Carlisa Colón (making the jump from WKAQ-TV where she guest hosted Alexandra a las 12), Rocky "The Kid" and professor Jorge Suárez Cáceres. The program premiered on October 31, 2022, at the 2:55pm time slot and serves as a lead-in for Las Noticias. The addition of El Poder Del Pueblo will up WLII-DT's local programming production to 35 hours per week.

The program emanates from the channel's studios in Guaynabo and follows a panel show format where Rodriguez sets up a topic for Rivera, Gallart and Colón to discuss their opinions on (while the audience can voice their own positions through polls that appear on screen). Jessica Serrano and Ricardo Eladio serve as on-field reporters covering news stories outside the studio. Additionally, the program will feature segments with collaborators such as Janet Parra, who served as a prosecutor for the Puerto Rico Justice Department and will be in charge of breaking down local crime stories and their subsequent court proceedings. Local politicians Jorge Suarez, Jorge Colberg, and Joanne Rodriguez Veve will also be featured as collaborators with occasional segments.

On January 17, 2023, Rocky "The Kid" announced he was leaving the show just three months after the premiere. Gallart cited burn out and wanting to spend more time with his family while announcing his decision on La Comay. Though other personalities have been filling Gallart's seat on the show a permanent replacement has not been announced yet.

Edición Puerto Rico (2018, 2021)
In March 2018, the network announced plans to restore a news program with the creation of Edición Puerto Rico. The program is a 30-minute no-anchor, voiceover, videotaped newscast which, in addition to being broadcast in Puerto Rico, is shown on many Univision-affiliate stations owned by Entravision (such as Boston, Orlando and Tampa) and Unimás owned-and-operated stations in New York, Chicago, Philadelphia, Raleigh and Atlanta. It airs on weekday mornings, except in Puerto Rico, where it airs weeknights at 11 p.m. (the first local-themed newscast at that time slot since the news department shutdown in 2014). On March 8, 2021, the newscast returned as Edición Puerto Rico aired weekdays at 5:30 p.m. (25 minutes) and 10:00 p.m. (one full hour) and was still produced at the studios of WOLE-DT in Aguadilla. The final newscast produced in Aguadilla aired on July 9, 2021.

Edición Digital Puerto Rico (2019–2021)

After more than five years without newscasts, WLII-DT aired a 60-minute local news program called Edición Digital Puerto Rico, similar to WKAQ-TV and WAPA-TV's news offerings. This newscast was produced at the studios of sister station WOLE-DT in Aguadilla. Started on April 22, 2019, and ending on March 5, 2021, the newscast focused on events happening in and around Puerto Rico and the United States, and interacts with others through social media platforms. The program was also aired on WOLE, Facebook Live, Univision Puerto Rico's Mobile App and Univision Puerto Rico's website.

Technical information

Subchannels
The stations' digital signals are multiplexed:

Analog-to-digital conversion 
WLII shut down its analog signal, over VHF channel 11, on June 12, 2009, the official date in which full-power television stations in the United States transitioned from analog to digital broadcasts under federal mandate. The station's digital signal relocated from its pre-transition UHF channel 56 to VHF channel 11, which was among the high band UHF channels (52–69) that were removed from broadcasting use as a result of the transition. WSUR switched to digital-only broadcasts on January 23, 2009, broadcasting on VHF channel 9 (or virtual channel 9.1).

Satellite, repeater and translator stations
WLII programming can be seen across Puerto Rico on the following stations:

Notes

References

External links 
 Official website
 
 

1960 establishments in Puerto Rico
Caguas, Puerto Rico
Television channels and stations established in 1960
Univision network affiliates
Television stations in Puerto Rico
UniMás network affiliates